Kuantan Singingi is a regency (kabupaten) of Riau, Indonesia. It is located on the island of Sumatra. The regency has an area of 7,656.03 km² and had a population of 292,116 at the 2010 Census, 313,986 at the 2015 Census and 334,943 at the 2020 Census. The seat of the regency is the town of Teluk Kuantan.

Administrative districts
At the time of the 2010 Census, the regency was divided into twelve districts (kecamatan), but three additional districts (Pucuk Rantau, Sentajo Raya and Kuantan Hilir Seberang) have subsequently been created by the division of existing districts. The are all listed below with their areas and their populations at the 2010 Census and the 2020 Census. The table also includes the locations of the district administrative centres, and the number of villages (rural desa and urban kelurahan) in each district.

Note: (a) the 2010 populations of these three new districts are included in the figures for the districts from which they were cut out.

Tourism
The most attractive tourist event is the Pacu Jalur which is held in every August annually. The Pacu Jalur is a kind of boat race.

References

Regencies of Riau